The Federal-Aid Highway Act of 1956, also known as the National Interstate and Defense Highways Act,  was enacted on June 29, 1956, when President Dwight D. Eisenhower signed the bill into law.

The addition of the term "defense" in the act's title was for two reasons: First, some of the original cost was diverted from defense funds. Secondly, most U.S. Air Force bases have a direct link to the system. One of the stated purposes was to provide access in order to defend the United States during a conventional or nuclear war with the Soviet Union and its communist allies. All of these links were in the original plans, although some, such as Wright-Patterson Air Force Base were not connected up in the 1950s, but only somewhat later.

The money for the Interstate Highway and Defense Highways was handled in a Highway Trust Fund that paid for 90 percent of highway construction costs with the states required to pay the remaining 10 percent. It was expected that the money would be generated through new taxes on fuel, automobiles, trucks, and tires. As a matter of practice, the federal portion of the cost of the Interstate Highway System has been paid for by taxes on gasoline and diesel fuel.

Historical background of the Interstate Highway System 

Some biographers have claimed that Eisenhower's support of the Federal-Aid Highway Act of 1956 can be attributed to his experiences in 1919 as a participant in the U.S. Army's first Transcontinental Motor Convoy across the United States on the historic Lincoln Highway, which was the first road across America. However, there is little evidence in either his private or public utterances from the time (1952-1956) to support this claim. The highly publicized 1919 convoy was intended, in part, to dramatize the need for better main highways and continued federal aid. The convoy left the Ellipse south of the White House in Washington, D.C., on July 7, 1919, and headed for Gettysburg, Pennsylvania. From there, it followed the Lincoln Highway to San Francisco. Bridges cracked and were rebuilt, vehicles became stuck in mud and equipment broke, but the convoy was greeted warmly by communities across the country. The convoy reached San Francisco on September 6, 1919.

The convoy was memorable enough for a young Army officer, 28-year-old Lieutenant Colonel Dwight David Eisenhower, to include a chapter about the trip, titled "Through Darkest America With Truck and Tank", in his book At Ease: Stories I Tell to Friends (Doubleday and Company, Inc., 1967). "The trip had been difficult, tiring and fun", he said. That experience on the Lincoln Highway, plus his observations of the German Autobahn network during World War II, may have convinced him to support construction of the Interstate System when he became president. "The old convoy had started me thinking about good, two-lane highways, but Germany had made me see the wisdom of broader ribbons across the land." His "Grand Plan" for highways, announced in 1954, led to the 1956 legislative breakthrough that created the Highway Trust Fund to accelerate construction of the Interstate System.

Though Eisenhower is sometimes described as having advocated for the highways for the purpose of national defense, scholarship has shown that he said relatively little about national defense when actually advocating for the plan, instead emphasizing highway fatalities and the importance of transportation for the national economy. In the event of a ground invasion by a foreign power, the U.S. Army would need good highways to be able to transport troops and material across the country efficiently. Following completion of the highways, the cross-country journey that took the convoy two months in 1919 was cut down to five days.

Eisenhower's role in passage of the 1956 Federal-Aid Act has been exaggerated. Eisenhower's preferred bill, authored by a group of non-governmental officials led by Gen. Lucius Clay, was voted down overwhelmingly by the Congress in 1955. The bill Eisenhower actually signed in 1956 was the brainchild of Congressional Democrats, in particular Albert Gore Sr., George Fallon, Dennis Chavez, and Hale Boggs. That bill authorized paying for highway expansion by establishing the Highway Trust Fund, which in turn would be funded by increases in highway user taxes on gasoline, diesel, tires, and other materials. For his part, during 1954-1955, Eisenhower had adamantly refused to support a highway bill that either raised user taxes or increased deficit spending, instead favoring a plan that would create a government corporation that would issue highway bonds. However, Congressional Democrats and members of his own administration, including his Comptroller General Joseph Campbell, publicly criticized Eisenhower's proposed government corporation on that grounds that its bonds would, in fact, count towards the national debt.

Tollways 
Many limited-access toll highways that had been built prior to the Interstate Highway Act were incorporated into the Interstate system (for example, the Ohio Turnpike carries portions of Interstate 76 (I-76), I-80, and I-90). For major turnpikes in New York, New Jersey, Pennsylvania, Ohio, Indiana, Illinois, Kansas, Oklahoma, Massachusetts, New Hampshire, Maine, and West Virginia, tolls continue to be collected, even though the turnpikes have long since been paid for. The money collected is used for highway maintenance, turnpike improvement projects and states' general funds. (That is not the case in Massachusetts, where the state constitution requires the money be used for transportation.) In addition, there are several major toll bridges and toll tunnels included in the Interstate system, including four bridges in the San Francisco Bay Area, ones linking Delaware with New Jersey, New Jersey with New York, New Jersey with Pennsylvania, the Upper and Lower peninsulas of Michigan, and Indiana and Kentucky in the Louisville area. Tolls collected on Interstate Highways remain on segments of I-95, I-94, I-90, I-88, I-87, I-80, I-77, I-76, I-70, I-64, I-44, I-35, I-294, I-355, and several others.

In addition, some states have built tolled express lanes within existing freeways.

Toll turnpikes in the following states have been declared paid off, and those highways have become standard freeways with the removal of tolls: Connecticut (I-95), Kentucky (part of I-65), Maryland (part of I-95), Texas (part of I-30), Virginia (the part of I-95 between Richmond and Petersburg). Additionally, Kentucky has several former toll roads that, in full or part, became part of the Interstate Highway system after the removal of tolls (parts of I-69, I-165, and I-169, with I-69 Spur and I-369 following in the near future).

References 

 The Greatest Decade 1956–1966 Part 1 Essential to the National Interest at United States Department of Transportation – Federal Highway Administration
 History of the Interstate Highway System at United States Department of Transportation – Federal Highway Administration
 Federal Highway Act of 1956

1956 in law
84th United States Congress
United States federal transportation legislation
Presidency of Dwight D. Eisenhower